Mount Hawea is a peak,  high, standing  east of Mount Markham in the Frigate Range, Antarctica. It was named by the northern party of the New Zealand Geological Survey Antarctic Expedition (1961–62) for the New Zealand frigate, Hawea.

References

Mountains of the Ross Dependency
Shackleton Coast